Philip Ambrose "Pip" Elson (born 14 April 1954) is an English professional golfer.  He is the son of the cricketer Gus Elson and the father of Jamie Elson.

Elson was born in Leamington Spa, Warwickshire, England. He won the British Youths Open Amateur Championship in 1971 before turning professional in 1973. In his breakthrough year he also won the BMGA Pro tour of the Club Championships of Wroxham Barns for the first time. He was that year's European Tour Sir Henry Cotton Rookie of the Year. He was a consistent player, finishing between 38th and 64th on the European Tour Order of Merit every year of his tour career, which lasted until 1982, but he never won a European Tour event. He played on the European Seniors Tour in 2004.

Results in major championships

Note: Elson only played in The Open Championship.

CUT = missed the half-way cut (3rd round cut in 1977 Open Championship)
"T" = tied

Team appearances
PGA Cup (representing Great Britain and Ireland): 1986

References

External links

English male golfers
European Tour golfers
European Senior Tour golfers
Sportspeople from Leamington Spa
1954 births
Living people